Kristóf Polgár (born 28 November 1996) is a Hungarian football player who plays for Gyirmót.

Club career
On 15 July 2022, Polgár signed a two-year contract, with an option for the third year, with Gyirmót.

Club statistics

Updated to games played as of 15 May 2021.

References

External links
MLSZ 
HLSZ 

1996 births
People from Komárom
Sportspeople from Komárom-Esztergom County
Living people
Hungarian footballers
Hungary youth international footballers
Hungary under-21 international footballers
Association football defenders
Szombathelyi Haladás footballers
Gyirmót FC Győr players
Diósgyőri VTK players
Nemzeti Bajnokság I players
Nemzeti Bajnokság II players